Jungle Emperor Leo, known in Japan as  is a 1997 Japanese animated film focusing on the last half of Osamu Tezuka's manga, Jungle Taitei (known in earlier US productions as Kimba the White Lion and Leo the Lion).

Plot
At the beginning of the film, Leo is an adult and learns that his mate, Lyra, has just given birth to twin cubs: Lune (pronounced Lu-Ney) and Lukio. After a grand celebration, the scene changes drastically to a bustling city where a man named Ham Egg is traveling from jeweler to jeweler to try and sell a special stone he found in the Bajalu Jungle.  After being turned down at every pawn shop and jeweler he goes to, the jewelers all inform someone of Ham Egg's whereabouts, and soon he is hauled away in a black car by intimidating men in black suits.

As it turns out, the stone that he's been trying to sell is really the "Moonlight Stone", a mineral that could be used as a power source and save the world from an impending energy crisis.  A scientific organization led by Dr. Plus and Dr. Minus seek the help of Ham Egg to lead them to the source of the Moonlight Stone so it can be salvaged.  However, Ham Egg is only interested in money and is soon persuaded by Dr. Plus, who is well aware of Ham Egg's illegal poaching activities. Ham Egg agrees to work for them, but demands to be put in charge of the search. Accompanying Ham Egg is Mr. Lemonade of the organization and Dr. Moustache, who is already stationed in the jungle.

When they arrive in the jungle, Dr. Moustache and Mr. Lemonade are shocked by Ham Egg and his "friends", who lack concern for any form of animal.  Dr. Moustache constantly argues with them over being respectful to nature, as Mr. Lemonade records everything that happens in his journal.

As Leo's son, Lune, becomes more and more curious of the human world, Leo continues to protect the animals of the jungle from which  may threaten them, including Ham Egg's barbarous actions, dissent amongst the animals including the African elephant leader Pagoora, and a deadly plague that is affecting the animals. But he is encouraged to go on by Earth Mother, the benevolent mammoth elder from Mount Moon.

Lune leaves the jungle behind and travels by a log in the water to a nearby city. Lune is found by fishers and taken to a circus. An altruistic girl named Mary from the circus decides to take care of him, and he befriends a rat named Jack. Eventually, a stork from the jungle finds Lune, tells him of how the disease is killing off many animals, and she leaves with her flock. Lune is frightened by the idea that his family may be dead. Eventually, there is a fire in the circus, and Lune gets all the animals to help put it out. Lune, Jack, and Mary, who took care of Lune bid their goodbyes, and Lune sneaks onto a boat that will help him get back to Africa. In the jungle, Lyra is affected by the deadly disease and shortly dies. Although Lukio comes down with the same ailment, Dr. Moustache is able to cure her and others, including Pagoora's son thus proving humans can be friends to animals.

Leo decides to lead Dr. Moustache and Dr. Lemonade to the center of the mountain where there are many moonlight stones. They go up the mountain, guided by Earth Mother who helps them fight a pack of dire wolves. Many hunters are lost on the way, but finally, they arrive. As they discover the stones, Ham Egg shoots at the trio. At the last minute, Mr. Lemonade jumps in the way, takes the bullet himself, and dies. They soon discover the stones, and Ham Egg, blinded by greed, steals one of the stones and swallows it so no one else can have it, but dies shortly afterward because the stone poisoned him. Dr. Moustache takes Leo and together they escape back down the mountain. It is then that Moustache suddenly realizes that the lion has gone blind. He rids of the stone they got because he believes it has ruined enough lives.

The film ends with Lune returning from the human world, and Dr. Moustache taking the cub to see his father's pelt. Leo died on the journey by stabbing himself with Dr. Moustache's knife. He did this so Dr. Moustache could eat his flesh, and clothe himself with Leo's fur so he can tell the humans what they need to know. Lune then begins nuzzling his fur. Dr. Moustache tells Lune about what his father did, "Your father was as wise as he was brave, and you should know what he did to save the world. He was the most courageous soul I've ever met, a true king who gave his life to save the land." Then, both of them head out into a meadow and see clouds in the shape of Leo.

Cast

See also
 List of Osamu Tezuka manga
 List of Osamu Tezuka anime
 Osamu Tezuka's Star System

References

External links

Jungle Emperor Leo at Tezuka Osamu @ World (archived)

1997 anime films
Animated films about elephants
Animated films about lions
Anime Works
Anime films based on manga
Circus films
Discotek Media
Films based on works by Osamu Tezuka
Films set in Africa
Japanese animated films
Jungle Emperor Leo
Osamu Tezuka anime
Tezuka Productions